Truax may refer to:

People
Truax (surname)

Places
Canada
Truax, Saskatchewan
United States
Truax, Wisconsin, an unincorporated community
Truaxton is the name of a former village in which is now Trenton, Michigan
Dane County Regional Airport in Wisconsin is also known as Truax Field
Naval Air Station Corpus Christi in Texas is also known as Truax Field